Mark Hollis (1955–2019), was an English musician.

Mark Hollis may also refer to:

 Mark Hollis (album) (1998)
 Mark Hollis (athletic director) (born 1962), American athletic director
 Mark Hollis (athlete) (born 1984), American pole vaulter
 Mark D. Hollis, director of the Centers for Disease Control and Prevention

Hollis, Mark